'Abū al-Ḥasan Alī ibn al-Mubārak(or al-Ḥasan) al-Aḥmar (d. 194 AH) (d. 810 AD) known for short as Abu al-Hasan al-Ahmar or al-Ahmar al-Nahawi, was a renowned Arab philologist and grammarian of the Kufan school. Described as 'The Sheikh of Arabic' by the historian al-Safadi. His knowledge of lexicographical matters are mentioned by many quotations in al-Gharib al-Musannaf of his contemporary Abu Ubayd al-Qasim ibn Salam (770–838).

Biography 
Abu al-Hasan was probably born in Basra at an unknown date. At a young age, he left for the Abbasid capital, Baghdad. There, he worked as one of the palace guards of the famous Abbasid caliph, Harun al-Rashid While working, he met the grammarian al-Kisai (d. 805), who at the time was the court tutor of Harun's sons, al-Amin and al-Ma'mun. Abu al-Hasan would therefore become a faithful disciple of al-Kisai, and he showed great interest in grammar and philology. He is also known to have been part of the munāẓara (lit. 'Debate') that was held between his master al-Kisai and the prominent grammarian of the time, Sibawayh (d. 796). Abu al-Hasan himself took part in tutoring al-Amin by the appointment of the court tutor, his teacher al-Kisai for a brief period of time.

Works 

 Kitab al-Tafsir (Book of Interpretation)
 Yaqin al-Bulagha''' (The Certainty of Eloquent Men)
 al-Tasrif (Morphology'')

See also 

 List of pre-modern Arab scientists and scholars

References 

8th-century births
810 deaths
8th-century Arabs
9th-century Arabs
8th-century lexicographers
9th-century lexicographers
8th-century people from the Abbasid Caliphate
Lexicographers of Arabic
People from Basra
Scholars from the Abbasid Caliphate
Arab grammarians
Year of birth unknown